The Walnut Grove Cemetery is a historic cemetery in rural Independence County, Arkansas, United States, on Walden Road, just north of Arkansas Highway 25, northwest of Cord.  Established in 1840, it is one of the oldest cemeteries in the area, set on what was once the only major roadway through the region.  It is the only significant surviving element of the community of Walnut Grove, which was located at a locally important crossroads in the 19th century.

The cemetery was listed on the National Register of Historic Places in 2013.

See also
 Akron Cemetery
 National Register of Historic Places listings in Independence County, Arkansas

References

External links
 

Cemeteries on the National Register of Historic Places in Arkansas
Buildings and structures completed in 1840
National Register of Historic Places in Independence County, Arkansas
1840 establishments in Arkansas
Cemeteries established in the 1840s